Edward John Boland (April 18, 1908 – February 5, 1993) was a Major League Baseball right fielder who played for three seasons. He played for the Philadelphia Phillies from 1934 to 1935. After a hiatus from the majors, he returned and played for the Washington Senators in 19 games during the 1944 Washington Senators season.

External links

1908 births
1993 deaths
Major League Baseball right fielders
Baseball players from New York (state)
Philadelphia Phillies players
Washington Senators (1901–1960) players
Albany Senators players
Buffalo Bisons (minor league) players
Danville Veterans players
Fairmont Black Diamonds players
Greensboro Patriots players
Rome Colonels players
Scottdale Cardinals players
Scottdale Scotties players
Waynesboro Red Birds players
Youngstown Buckeyes players
People from Long Island City, Queens
Port Chester Clippers players